Junix is a genus of dragonfly in the family Coenagrionidae. It contains the following species:
 Junix elumbis

Coenagrionidae
Taxonomy articles created by Polbot